The media in Wales provide services in both English and Welsh, and play a role in modern Welsh culture. BBC Wales began broadcasting in 1923 have helped to promote a form of standardised spoken Welsh, and one historian has argued that the concept of Wales as a single national entity owes much to modern broadcasting. The national broadcasters are based in the capital, Cardiff.

Newspapers and news magazines

History of newspapers in Wales

The initial growth of newspaper publishing in Wales was slow in comparison to that of urban England, mainly due to distribution problems caused by poor transport networks and in particular rail links. It was further hindered by taxes on paper, advertising and the newspapers themselves. This changed in the early 19th century when Wales experienced sweeping social changes due to the Industrial Revolution. A rapid surge in population growth, along with the adoption of radacalist political views and the growth of Nonconformity saw the development of newspapers publishing in Wales. However the market for newspapers in Wales was much smaller than in England and was also to some extent split between two languages.

The first weekly newspaper in Wales was The Cambrian, published in 1804 and based in Swansea. Printed only in the English language, it was initially restricted to circulation in the southern towns of Wales, but over time its distribution increased, reaching not just South Wales, but also the West of England, America, India and the British colonies. The newspaper mainly covered local and general news, but also advocated mining, agricultural, and commercial interests. The success of The Cambrian was followed by other weeklies, including the North Wales Gazette (Bangor, 1808) and the Carmarthen Journal (Carmarthen, 1910). The first Welsh-language weekly, Seren Gomer, was founded by Joseph Harris (Gomer) in Swansea in 1814. It covered national, foreign, political and religious news, and also included literary contributions from notable Welsh Nonconformists. Although it had a considerable circulation, the tax on paper made the Seren Gomer unviable, and it stopped after 85 issues. It was relaunched as a fortnightly in 1818 and then a monthly in 1820.

Few newspapers were established in Wales in the 1820s and 1830s. Both the Cardiff Weekly Reporter and the Newport Review were launched in Cardiff in 1822, and in 1836 the Welsh-language weekly Cronicl yr Oes (The Chronicle of the Age) began distributing from Mold in North Wales. 1836 also saw the printing of a West Wales paper, the Cambrian Gazette: Y Freinlen Gymroaidd ("The Welshmen's Charter"), based in Aberystwyth. All four were short lived. More successful papers from that period included the Monmouthshire Merlin (Newport, 1829–91) and The Welshman (1832-1984). In 1843, Yr Amserau (The Times), which was to become the first successful Welsh-language newspaper, was launched. Established across the border in Liverpool by Gwilym Hiraethog, it was later bought by Thomas Gee of Denbigh in 1859 and amalgamated with Baner Cymru (The Banner of Wales) (1857) to form Baner ac Amserau Cymru. This became a powerful influence on Welsh life, and through its most notable contributor John Griffith, writing under his pen name Y Gohebydd (The Correspondent), the paper would champion radical causes, including the defence of Nonconformist views.

When stamp duty on newspapers was abolished in 1855, the effect was a rise in the number of publications, and most of the denominational papers in Wales originated around this period. The Baptist Seren Cymru (Star of Wales) launched in Carmarthen 1851, but had a short run followed by a more successful launch when it re-established in 1856. This was followed by the Congregationalists' Y Tyst Cymreig (The Welsh Witness) (1867), the Calvinistic Methodists' Y Goleuad (The Illuminator) (1869), the Wesleyans' Y Gwyliedydd (The Sentinel) (1877) and the Anglican Y Llan a'r Dywysogaeth (The Parish and Principality) (1881). These religious papers were published nationally and reported on home and wider British news, though they also gave leadership on political and social issues.

Outside of Cardiff and Swansea, two other towns in the south Wales, Merthyr Tydfil and Aberdare, developed as newspaper publishing hubs in the mid- to late 19th century. Josiah Thomas Jones of Aberdare launched both Y Gwron Cymreig ("The Welsh Hero", 1854–60) and The Aberdare Times (1861-1902), while David Williams (Alaw Goch), Abraham Mason and William Williams (Carw Goch) also of Aberdare, published Y Gwladgarwr ("The Patriot", 1858–82). The most important of these newspapers was Tarian y Gweithiwr ("The Workers' Shield"), which had a strong Liberal-Labour bias and stood for workers' rights; this made it popular with the coal miners and tinplate workers of the region. Merthyr Tydfil in turn was home to The Cardiff and Merthyr Guardian (1832–74), The Merthyr Star (1859-1881), Y Fellten ("The Lightning Flash", 1868–76), and two Chartist publications The Workman and Udgorn Cymru ("The Trumpet of Wales").

In the north, Bangor and Caernarfon rose as important print towns. The North Wales Gazette was first published in Bangor in 1808 before changing title to the North Wales Chronicle in 1827. In direct conflict was the Carnarvon and Denbigh Herald, whose editorials were Liberal and Nonconformist, in contrast with the support of the Chronicle for Toryism and the Established Church.

Modern national newspapers
Unlike Scotland and Northern Ireland, the Welsh national press is limited. The only English-language Wales-based national newspapers are the Western Mail, produced by Reach plc and The National produced by Newsquest. The Western Mail's Sunday counterpart is the Wales on Sunday.

One study in the 1990s found that the most widely read newspaper in Wales was The Sun. Despite the popularity of London-based newspapers in Wales, most UK newspapers do not produce regional editions for the Welsh audience, although until 2003 The Mirror was branded as the Welsh Mirror. Since the 1970s, there has been a decline in the number of Fleet Street newspaper journalists based in Wales; now all national UK newspapers rely on the Press Association reporter in Wales.

Modern regional newspapers

Daily newspapers
The most popular local newspapers in Wales, as of 2018, are the Daily Post, the Swansea-based South Wales Evening Post, the Cardiff-based South Wales Echo and Western Mail, and the Newport-based South Wales Argus. The North Wales edition of the Liverpool Daily Post is distributed in that region. The Evening Leader is the main evening newspaper for North East Wales.

Weekly newspapers

Y Cymro ("The Welshman", Welsh pronunciation: [ə ˈkəmrɔ]) was Wales' last Welsh language weekly newspaper, first published in 1932. By the time of its cessation in 2017 its sales had dwindled to around 2,000 copies. It now shares content through social media and has applied for funding from the Welsh Books Council for the resumption of physical publication.

Literature

Publishers
There are a number of large, medium, and small sized publishing houses across Wales, however the industry has seen contraction in recent years. The Wales Books Council states that there are 109 publishers in Wales. Funding for literature in Wales is dominated by the Welsh Books Council in Cardiff and Literature Wales in Aberystwyth.

Gomer Press is the largest and oldest publisher of English and Welsh language books in Wales, established in 1892. It is based in Llandysul, and publishes around 120 titles a year. In September 2019 it was announced Gomer would be closing their publishing arm to focus on printing. Its 55 employees will be retained but will no longer publish new titles, of which it produced 36 in 2018. It marks the end of 127 years of publishing.
 Publish & Print are publishers based in Pontypridd, founded in 2014 by Welsh writer Dave Lewis.
 Accent Press are publishers based in Mountain Ash and Cardiff, founded in 2003 by Hazel Cushion.
Parthian Books are Cardigan based publishers established in 1994 by Richard Lewis Davies and Gillian Griffiths.
 Seren are Bridgend based independent publishers established in 1988. They are a subsidiary of Poetry Wales Press Ltd.
 Dref Wen are Cardiff based publishers established in 1998 specialising in children's books written in both English and Welsh.
 Welsh Academic Press are a publishing house established in 1994 focused on historical and political non-fictio. Their imprint St David's Press focus on leisure, sport and history.
 Crown House Publishing are a Carmarthen based publishing company established in 1998. They specialise in literature about education, coaching, NLP, hypnosis, self-help and personal development
 Graffeg are publishers founded in 2003 by Peter Gill specialising in illustrated children's and non-fiction books.
 Deadstar Publishing are graphic novel publishers based in Cardiff established in 2011.
 University of Wales Press were established in 1922 and publish 50 to 70 new titles each year. Their work focuses on the humanities, arts, and social sciences.

Modern magazines
Around Town is a free lifestyle and events magazine which publishes four variant editions that serve Bridgend, Cardiff, Swansea and Rhondda Cynon Taff.

Golwg ("View"; Welsh pronunciation: [ˈɡɔlʊk]) is a Welsh-language magazine established in 1988. It covers current events and features and claims a monthly circulation of 12,000, the largest circulation of any magazine in Wales.

Cambria, which referred to itself as the 'National Magazine of Wales', was first launched in 1997 and was published bi-monthly. A glossy publication covering the arts, current affairs, topical subjects, history and lifestyle, it was aimed at ABC1 readers. It faced closure in 2015 after losing its funding from the Welsh Books Council, but was temporarily saved after a newly formed company, MegaGroup Newspapers, bought a half share in the publication. It printed its final issue in 2016 and MegaGroup was made insolvent in 2017.

Planet, a bi-monthly magazine covering the arts, literature and politics in Wales and the wider world, is produced in Aberystwyth. Each edition features poems and short stories alongside cultural reviews and political analysis.

A Welsh edition of the Times Educational Supplement, called TES Cymru, dedicates a number of pages to Wales' devolved education system, with a reporter based in Cardiff.

South Wales Media Ltd produce local community magazines in the Swansea & Neath Port Talbot counties. The Ponty Mag which covers Pontardawe, Clydach Mag covering Clydach, Swansea East Mag and SA4 Magazine. The also produce Swansea City FC fanzine Jack Swan magazine.

Furthermore, Wales has a network of local Welsh-language newsletters. Known as papurau bro ("local papers"), they are produced by volunteers and generally published monthly, serving a hyperlocal market. The first such publication was Y Dinesydd ("The Citizen"), established in Cardiff in April 1973. There are currently over 50 papurau bro, produced throughout Wales.

Zines
There are a large number of specialist zines produced in Wales, including Gagged! (the South Wales anarchist newsletter), The Free Flyer (the free paper for "Brecon, Builth, Crickhowell, Hay on Wye, Llandovery, Llandrindod, Llanwrtyd, Talgarth and Rhayader"), and the Cambrian Snooze newsletter in Aberystwyth.

Digital 
For 2019–20 the Welsh Government has allocated a £200,000 budget to stimulate and continue digital and hyperlocal journalism in Wales.

Golwg360
In 2009 Golwg launched Golwg360, a news website offering daily Welsh and international news in the Welsh language. It was initially launched with £600,000 funding from the Welsh Government, and is currently funded through the Welsh Books Council.

Senedd Home
Blogger Owen Donovan operates an extensive network of blogs covering a range of hyperlocal and national events. Three blogs are published, namely Senedd Home (reporting on business of the Senedd and Welsh Government), State of Wales (a pro-independence blog about Welsh national issues and developments), and Oggy Bloggy Ogwr, which reports on Local Authority matters in Wales.

Nation.Cymru

Nation.Cymru is a national English language news service established in 2017 by Bangor University journalism lecturer and former Golwg editor Ifan Morgan Jones, alongside its current CEO Mark Mansfield. The service states it aims to address the absence of a national print media in Wales, and provide pan-Wales reporting to better inform Welsh people particularly about politics, the Welsh Parliament (Senedd), and the functioning of the devolved Government. It has an agreement with Owen Donovan of Senedd Home to report on stories related to Welsh parliamentary business.

Sports media
Other websites in the sphere include sports pages Dai Sport and Y Clwb Pel Droed.

Business media and hyperlocal reporting
Business news is dominated in Wales by Business News Wales, and hyperlocal sites operate such as Caerphilly Observer, Wrexham.com, Deeside.com, Cwmbran Life, The Bangor Aye, We Are Cardiff, Cardiff Directory Wales and My Cardiff North.

Broadcasting

History

 
At 5 pm on 13 February 1923, 5WA Cardiff, a forerunner of BBC Radio Wales, first broadcast from a music shop at 19 Castle Street in Cardiff city centre. Later that evening Mostyn Thomas sang Dafydd y Garreg Wen, which was the first Welsh language song to be broadcast. A commemorative plaque records the event. However 5WA Cardiff ended on 28 May 1923.

Television

Public service television broadcasting 
BBC Wales is based in Broadcasting House, Llandaff, northern Cardiff, and provides BBC One Wales and BBC Two Wales television channels.  BBC Wales produces the most-watched Welsh news programme BBC Wales Today, current affairs programme Week In Week Out, sports coverage in Scrum V and Sport Wales, science-fiction programmes including Doctor Who and Torchwood, and factual programmes such as X-Ray.

S4C is the main Welsh-language station and has its headquarters in Llanishen, northern Cardiff. The channel features around 10 hours a week of programmes made in Welsh by BBC Wales, such as Newyddion (News) and Pobol y Cwm (a long-running soap opera) as well as programmes made by independent production companies.

Commercial television broadcasting 
ITV Wales is based in Culverhouse Cross, western Cardiff and produces regional news and factual programmes such as Wales Tonight, Wales This Week, Sharp End and The Wales Show.

In 2012 Chancellor George Osborne invited new local television licence bids in order to establish stations akin to US decentralized affiliate broadcasters. Since introduction, there have been two dominant companies who operate the majority of local licenses in the UK, specifically Local Television Limited, who run Cardiff TV and North Wales TV, and That's TV, who run the That's Swansea Bay station.

Radio

Public service radio broadcasting 
The BBC runs two national radio stations, BBC Radio Wales in English and BBC Radio Cymru in Welsh. A third national service is provided by [[Heart 
South Wales]] and [[Heart North and Mid Wales. There are also a number of commercial and community radio stations throughout the country which broadcast in both Welsh and English.

Commercial radio broadcasting 
In 2019, UK radio conglomerate Global Plc cut a significant amount of its local programing across the UK, specifically stations branded as Capital, Smooth, and Heart, as well as those produced under license for Communicorp (owner of the Capital South Wales brand).

The result is that a majority of content on five of the top ten Welsh radio stations is now produced in London, with the exception of Capital Cymru who retained local programming in order to meet their Welsh language obligations.

The industry monitor Rajar has recorded a subsequent fall in listenership of these deregulated stations, and an increase in listenership for Capital's commercial competitors, including Nation Radio and Dragon Radio Wales.

See also
BBC Wales Drama Village
Mass media
Media in Cardiff
Media Wales

References

Sources

Primary sources

External links
 ICWales.co.uk
 NewsWales.co.uk